Colm Farrell is an Irish sportsperson.  He plays hurling with his local club Hwh Bunclody and has been a member of the Wexford senior inter-county team since 2008.

Playing career
Farrell made his championship debut against Dublin in the Leinster Semi-final which ended in a replay. He never featured in the 2009 Hurling Championship after he suffered a broken leg which ruled him out for the season. He however returned at the start of 2010 and claimed his first National Hurling league medal. But Wexford were soon early exited by Galway in Leinster and Tipperary in the qualifiers.

References

Living people
Wexford inter-county hurlers
HWH Bunclody hurlers
Year of birth missing (living people)